Lutembe Bay is a wetland on the edge of Lake Victoria.

Conservation
Lutumbe Bay is one of Uganda's 33 Important Bird Areas and since 2006 a Ramsar-listed wetland of international importance. The bay is notable for its population of as many as 1.5m white-winged tern. 

in 2013 a portion of the wetland was illegally filled with soil by the flower export giant Rosebud Ltd.

References

Ramsar sites in Uganda
Important Bird Areas of Uganda
Wakiso District